Kentucky Route 1247 (KY 1247) is a  secondary state highway in southeast-central Kentucky. It traverses Pulaski and Lincoln counties. The highway was formerly signed as U.S. Route 27 (US 27).

Route description
KY 1247 starts at a major interchange-style junction at Burnside where KY 90 begins its currency with US 27 southward into McCreary County. KY 1247 goes northward to cross the KY 914 (Somerset Bypass). It then traverses downtown Somerset, where it crosses two alignments of KY 80, the KY 80 Business first, and then the main KY 80 alignment.

Beyond that point while traversing the communities of Science Hill and Eubank and crossing KY 70 at Eubank, KY 1247 closely follows US 27 for the remainder of the route's length. However, there are two occasions where it runs concurrently with US 27 in southern and central Lincoln County. KY 328 is the only other route that KY 1247 runs concurrently with at one point in southern Lincoln County.

History

Most of KY 1247's current alignment north of Somerset was the original alignment of US 27 until the 1960s, when a streamlined alignment of US 27 was built in Lincoln and northern Pulaski County.

Since 2015, KY 1247 is now accessible from a new interchange of the recently extended Louie B. Nunn Cumberland Parkway.

Major intersections

References

External links
KY 1247 at Kentucky Roads

1247
U.S. Route 27
1247
1247